Miyu Pampa or Miyupampa (Quechua miyu poison, pampa a large plain, "poison plain", Hispanicized spellings Miopampa, Miu Pampa) is an archaeological site in Peru. It lies in the Huánuco Region, Huamalíes Province, Jircan District. It is situated at a height of about  about 500 m northeast of Jircan.

See also 
 Awqa Punta
 Urpish

References 

Archaeological sites in Huánuco Region
Archaeological sites in Peru